The Song They Sang... When Rome Fell is the 2002 debut release by Vermont-based American singer-songwriter Anaïs Mitchell. The album was made during the singer's 6-month stay in Austin, Texas, and was recorded in a single afternoon. It consists of Mitchell playing her acoustic guitar and singing with sparse production. The record is currently out of print and is not referenced among the rest of Mitchell's albums on her site's discography section.

Track listing 
 The Calling
 Parking Lot Nudie Bar
 Make It Up
 Hymn For The Exiled
 Work Makes Free
 Deliberately
 The Routine
 Orleanna
 The Song They Sang When Rome Fell
 Hold This
 Go Fuck Yourself

Notes 

Anaïs Mitchell albums
2002 debut albums